Hazara Swat is a village and District Swat Tehsil Kabal located 7 km away from main Minogra city. Hazara Village has pretty much advantage over other villages in swat as there are  government schools, few private schools and private hospitals.

References

Populated places in Swat District